Moore Creek is a short ephemeral stream in Santa Cruz, California, that drains the lower UCSC campus and empties into the Pacific.  On its course from the Moore Creek Preserve, it runs through Antonelli Pond by the UCSC Administration Building, then through a tidal wetland to the ocean at Natural Bridges State Beach.

References

Rivers of California
Rivers of Santa Cruz County, California